Nogometni klub Slaven Belupo, often referred to as NK Slaven Belupo, Slaven Belupo or simply Slaven, and known internationally as NK Slaven Koprivnica, is a Croatian professional football club based in the city of Koprivnica in the north of Croatia. They play their home matches at Gradski stadion in Koprivnica.

History
The first football club in Koprivnica was founded in June 1907, when a student team was formed and named Đački nogometni klub, which is Croatian for Students' Football Club. The name Slaven first appeared when a sports club named HŠK Slaven was founded by the members of the Friedrich family on 20 August 1912 and this is considered to be the foundation date of the present-day club. The club won the Croatian championship in 1920, which was one of the Yugoslav regional championships. Slaven was subsequently renamed HŠK Victorija, but disbanded six years later due to financial difficulties. Subsequently, the city of Koprivnica was without a football club for four years, between 1926 and 1930.

Between 1930 and 1945, the club was known as HŠK Koprivnica, HŠK Danica and RNHŠK Sloga, before the name Slaven returned with the foundation of FD Slaven. From 1953, the club was known as SD Podravka, before being renamed to NK Slaven in 1958. The name Slaven remains until today, with occasional changes to the name of the club's principal sponsors. The club was thus known as NK Slaven Bilokalnik between 1992 and 1994, after which it was changed to its current name following a sponsorship agreement with the Koprivnica-based pharmaceutical company Belupo.

Slaven gained their first promotion to the Prva HNL in 1997 and have never been relegated. In 2000, they finished fifth in the Prva HNL and qualified for the UEFA Intertoto Cup. In their first Intertoto Cup appearance, they managed to reach the third round of the competition before being eliminated by Czech club Sigma Olomouc after losing 2–0 at home and getting a goalless draw on the road. One year later, they repeated the success and were eliminated by renowned English club Aston Villa with a 3–2 aggregate defeat. In their next two Intertoto Cup appearances, they were even more successful as they reached the semifinals of the competition on both occasions. They were eliminated after losing to renowned clubs Stuttgart from Germany and Lille from France, respectively. Their last Intertoto Cup appearance in 2005 ended in the third round with a 4–0 aggregate defeat to Spanish club Deportivo La Coruña, having lost the first leg by 1–0 and the second leg by 0–3.

Slaven Belupo heads the all-time Intertoto Cup table being the most successful team in history of this tournament.

In 2007, the club reached the Croatian Cup final for the first time, after defeating defending Cup holders HNK Rijeka 3–2 on aggregate. In the final, they lost to Dinamo Zagreb 2–1 on aggregate. Despite having lost the final, Slaven qualified for the UEFA Cup for the first time in their history, since Dinamo had already qualified for the UEFA Champions League by virtue of having won the Prva HNL.

Slaven reached the second qualifying round of the 2007–08 UEFA Cup, defeating Albanian side Teuta Durrës 8–4 on aggregate before being eliminated after a 4–2 aggregate defeat to Turkish club Galatasaray. In 2008, Slaven finished runners-up in the Croatian league, which remains their best domestic result to date.

On 28 August 2008 Slaven Belupo qualified for the 2008–09 UEFA Cup by beating Aris of Greece 2–1 on aggregate, thereby achieving arguably the best result in the history of the club.

Slaven finished 3rd in the 2011–12 1. HNL, qualifying for the 2012–13 UEFA Europa League. After defeating Portadown 10–2 on aggregate they bowed out to Spanish giants Athletic Bilbao 4–3 on aggregate.

In 2016, Slaven defeated HNK Rijeka 4–2 on aggregate in the 2015–16 Croatian Football Cup semi-final, reaching the final for the second time in their history.

Players

Current squad

Out on loan

Recent seasons

European record

Summary

Source: uefa.com, Last updated on 9 August 2012Pld = Matches played; W = Matches won; D = Matches drawn; L = Matches lost; GF = Goals for; GA = Goals against

By result

Last updated: 9 August 2012

By season

Last updated on 9 August 2012

Player records
Most appearances in UEFA club competitions: 34 appearances
  Petar Bošnjak
Top scorers in UEFA club competitions: 14 goals
  Marijo Dodik

Notable players

To appear in this section a player must have:
Played at least 150 league games for the club;
Scored at least 50 league goals for the club; or
Played at least one international match for their national team while playing for NK Slaven Belupo.
Years in brackets indicate their spells at the club.

 Roy Ferenčina (1997–2005)
 Marijo Dodik (1998–2007)
 Petar Bošnjak (1999–2008)
 Srebrenko Posavec (2000–05, 2006–10)
 Bojan Vručina (2004–10, 2011–12)
 Silvio Rodić (2005–14)
 Mateas Delić (2006–10, 2012–16, 2018–)
 Vedran Purić (2008–2018)
 Fidan Aliti (2016–2017)
 Nikola Katić (2016–2018)

Coaching history

References

External links
 
Slaven Belupo profile at UEFA.com
Slaven Belupo profile at Sportnet.hr 

 
Association football clubs established in 1907
Football clubs in Croatia
Football clubs in Koprivnica-Križevci County
Sport in Koprivnica